The American Hockey League (AHL) is a professional ice hockey league composed of 32 teams, founded in 1936. Each team is entitled to one head coach who handles the directing of games and team practices, while providing direction and strategy for their players and deciding which players will play in games and the lines they will play on. In some cases, a coach will only serve on an interim basis, while some teams may have more than one coach who serve as co-coaches. Outside the team management, the coach also addresses the media.

Key 
{| class="wikitable"
! scope="col" |Abbreviation
! scope="col" |Definition
|-
! scope="row" |G
|Games coached
|-
! scope="row" |W
|Wins
|-
! scope="row" |L
|Losses
|-
! scope="row" |T
|Ties
|-
! scope="row" |OTL
|Overtime/Shootout losses
|-
! scope="row" |Pts.
|Points
|-
! scope="row" |P%
|Points percentage{{efn|Points percentage is calculated as follows: (Wins +  ½ Ties + ½ Overtime/shootout losses) ÷ Games Coached|group=lower-alpha}}
|}

 Coaches Note: Statistics are updated through the previous season (2021–22).''

Notes

References 

 
American Hockey League lists
American Hockey League coaches